The Ministry of Chittagong Hill Tracts Affairs (Pārbatya caṭṭagrāma biṣaẏaka mantraṇālaẏa) is the government ministry of Bangladesh responsible for Chittagong Hill Tracts.

Directorates
Chittagong Hill Tracts Development Board 
Refugee Rehabilitation Task Force
Khagrachhari Hill District Council
Chittagong Hill Tracts Regional Council
Bandarban Hill District Council
Rangamati Hill District Council

References

 
Chittagong Hill Tracts Affairs
Indigenous affairs ministries
Chittagong Hill Tracts